The Kocatepe Mosque is the largest mosque in Ankara, Turkey. It was built between 1967 and 1987 in the Kocatepe quarter in Kızılay, and its size and prominent situation have made it a landmark that can be seen from almost anywhere in central Ankara.

History
The idea of building the Kocatepe Mosque dates back to the 1940s. On December 8, 1944, Ahmet Hamdi Akseki, the vice-president of Turkish Religious Affairs, along with seventy-two founding members, established a society known as the "Society to Build a Mosque in Yenişehir, Ankara." In 1947 this society called for projects to be drawn up by architects, but none of the submitted projects were accepted. In 1956, through the efforts of the late Adnan Menderes, Prime Minister of the time, land was allocated for the project to build a mosque in Ankara, and a request for projects was made once again in 1957. This time thirty-six projects were evaluated, with the joint project of Vedat Dalokay and Nejat Tekelioğlu being chosen as the one to be implemented.

Architecture

The accepted project was an innovative and modern design. The construction started, but due to heavy critique from conservatives for its modernist look, the construction was stopped at the foundation level. Vedat Dalokay later built a modified version of the Kocatepe Mosque after winning an international competition for the Shah Faisal Mosque in Islamabad, Pakistan in 1969. This mosque, which can accommodate 24,000 worshippers, is one of the largest mosques of the world, and accepted by many as the frontiers of modern Islamic architecture.

After a third architectural competition in 1967, a more conservative or nostalgic design by Hüsrev Tayla and M. Fatin Uluengin was chosen to be built. Completed in 1987, this project is built in a neo-classical Ottoman architecture style, and is an eclectic building inspired by the Selimiye Mosque in Edirne, and the Sehzade and Sultan Ahmet mosques in Istanbul, which in turn, were influenced by the Eastern Roman architecture of the Hagia Sophia.

References

As, Imdat, "Vedat Dalokay's Unbuilt Project: A Lost Opportunity," in "The Digital Mosque: A New Paradigm in Mosque Design" Journal of Architectural Education (JAE), Volume 60, Issue 1, 2006, pp.54-66
As, Imdat "The Kocatepe Mosque Experience, " in Emergent Design: Rethinking Contemporary Mosque Architecture in Light of Digital Technology, S.M.Arch.S. Thesis, Massachusetts Institute of Technology, Cambridge, MA, 2002. pp.24-46

External links

Images of the Kocatepe Mosque
3D panoramic tour of the Kocatepe Mosque
Model photos of Vedat Dalokay's unbuilt mosque design for the Kocatepe Mosque
Animation of Vedat Dalokay's unbuilt mosque design for the Kocatepe Mosque
Dimensions of the Mosque can be found in the 11th paragraph of this acoustical study of the mosque

1987 establishments in Turkey
Mosques in Ankara
Mosques completed in 1987
Religious buildings and structures completed in 1987
Landmarks in Turkey
Mosque buildings with domes
20th-century religious buildings and structures in Turkey